Statistics of Swedish football Division 2 for the 2012 season.

League standings

Norrland 2012

Norra Svealand 2012

Södra Svealand 2012

Östra Götaland 2012

Västra Götaland 2012

Södra Götaland 2012

Player of the year awards

Ever since 2003 the online bookmaker Unibet have given out awards at the end of the season to the best players in Division 2. The recipients are decided by a jury of sportsjournalists, coaches and football experts. The names highlighted in green won the overall national award.

References 

Swedish Football Division 2 seasons
4
Sweden
Sweden